Limone may refer to:

 Limone (Wedding Peach), fictional character
 Limone, Italy or Limone sul Garda, town and comune in Italy
 Limone Piemonte, town and comune in Italy